Andre Birleanu (born August 7, 1982) is a Russian-Romanian model.

Early life
Birleanu is the son of Vladimir Simonov, a Russian diplomat and international lawyer and Carmen Bîrleanu, a Romanian diplomat. Birleanu was born in Moscow, but traveled extensively due to his father's work in the Soviet diplomatic corp. In 1996, his mother was working for the United Nations in New York and invited her son to America to attend University. He attended John Jay Criminal Justice Academy, but stopped attending to pursue a career in modeling.

Public image
MTV channel named Andre Birleanu "one of the hottest men on television" placing him on their top 10 list. ABC channel named Birleanu one of the top TV bad boys adding that "when Andre Birleanu graced our television sets, he brought sexy back with a villainous twist ". He was named by People Magazine as one of the sexiest men while the American Broadcasting Company called him one of Top 10 TV Villains.

Career

Personal life
While residing and filming between New York and Hollywood in 2009, he dated Brazilian model Ana Catharina Soares Jaqueira who is the mother of his first child, Eva Sofia Birleanu. Soon after the birth in Brazil, the relationship ended. Starting in 2012, he dated Brazilian model Eloisa Fontes for two years and in 2014 they got married. Eloisa is the mother of his second daughter Azzura Birleanu,. In September 2015 Birleanu filed for divorce, won custody away from the mother and since raised his second daughter by himself. In December 2018 he started dating model Cezara Tomenco, and in September 2019 they had a daughter.

See also
 List of male underwear models

References

External links

Living people
Russian male models
1982 births
Reality modeling competition participants
Romanian male models
Russian emigrants to the United States